Tallahoma Creek is a stream in the U.S. state of Mississippi. It is a right tributary of Tallahala Creek, joining it east of Ellisville.

Tallahoma is a name derived from the Choctaw language meaning "red rock". Variant names are "Tali Homma Creek", "Talla Homa Creek", and "Tallohoma Creek".

References

Rivers of Mississippi
Rivers of Jasper County, Mississippi
Rivers of Jones County, Mississippi
Rivers of Newton County, Mississippi
Mississippi placenames of Native American origin